Lonnie E. Boyett (born December 24, 1953) is a former American football tight end who played one season with the San Francisco 49ers of the National Football League (NFL). He played college football at California State University, Northridge and attended Antelope Valley High School in Lancaster, California. He was also a member of the Tampa Bay Buccaneers and Oakland Raiders. Boyett is an uncle of NFL quarterbacks David and Derek Carr.

References

External links
Just Sports Stats

1953 births
Living people
Players of American football from California
American football tight ends
Cal State Northridge Matadors football players
Oakland Raiders players
Tampa Bay Buccaneers players
San Francisco 49ers players
Sportspeople from Los Angeles County, California
People from Lancaster, California
Antelope Valley High School alumni